Videoart at Midnight is an international forum fostering contemporary art, in particular film, new media art and video art. In a monthly program international artists are invited to show their work in the big cinema hall of the Kino Babylon in the Mitte neighborhood of Berlin.

Background 
Videoart at Midnight is a private initiative, founded in 2008 by Olaf Stüber and Ivo Wessel. Monthly since, and always on a Friday at midnight, Stüber invites artists to show their works within in the "Dispositif cinema" to put them up for discourse. Every night is dedicated to one artist. The artist is present. It is often the occasion for a premiere of a video work, sometimes accompanied by live acts, such as performances, concerts, lectures or artist talks.
 
The aim of the screening series is to offer a forum for Berlin's international art scene and to give an insight into an artist media that is gaining an increasing importance within the contemporary art production.

Videoart at Midnight is a non-profit cultural program.

Program 

2023: Laure Prouvost, Mikhail Karikis, Annika Kahrs.
2022: Popo Fan, Cyrill Lachauer, Anna Ehrenstein, Rosa Barba, Marianna Simnett, Mathieu Kleyebe Abonnenc, Vajiko Chachkhiani, Wong Ping, C-98.
2021: Peter Miller, Ahmet Öğüt, Haris Epaminonda.
2020: Willem de Rooij, Eli Cortiñas, Brody Condon, Gernot Wieland.
2019: Li Zhenhua, Ari Benjamin Meyers, Ina Wudtke, Monira Al Qadiri, Lucy Beech, Jan-Peter E.R. Sonntag, Korpys/Löffler, Bigert & Bergström, Sandra Schäfer, Julian Rosefeldt.
2018: Wolfgang Tillmans, Klaus vom Bruch, Maya Schweizer, Pauline Curnier Jardin.
2017: Pola Sieverding, Tobias Zielony, Mario Rizzi, Yuri Ancarani, Andy Graydon, Agnieszka Polska, Theo Eshetu, Simon Faithfull, Michel Auder, Hiwa K.
2016: Assaf Gruber, Katarina Zdjelar, Christoph Girardet & Matthias Müller, Eva Meyer & Eran Schaerf, Lynne Marsh, Joep van Liefland, Dafna Maimon, Jeremy Shaw, Shahram Entekhabi, Christian Falsnaes.
2015: John Bock, Stefan Zeyen, Amie Siegel, Shingo Yoshida, Filipa César, Erik Bünger, Dani Gal, Ulu Braun, Chto Delat?, Yael Bartana.
2014: Safy Sniper, Isabell Heimerdinger, Vibeke Tandberg, Sven Johne, Julieta Aranda, Guido van der Werve, Anri Sala, Marcel Odenbach, Phil Collins, Alice Creischer & Andreas Siekmann.
 2013: Hito Steyerl, Reynold Reynolds, Candice Breitz, Köken Ergun, Martin Brand, Nina Fischer & Maroan el Sani, Annika Eriksson, Martin Skauen, Douglas Gordon, Harun Farocki.
 2012: Rebecca Ann Tess, Bettina Nürnberg & Dirk Peuker, Armin Linke, Clemens von Wedemeyer, Keren Cytter, Christian Jankowski, Melanie Manchot, Manuel Graf, Ming Wong, Omer Fast, Niklas Goldbach.
 2011: Matthias Baader Holst, Erik Schmidt, Delia Gonzalez and Black Leotard Front, Anja Kirschner & David Panos, Chicks on Speed, Knut Klassen, Bjørn Melhus, Mathilde Rosier, Benjamin Heisenberg, Bewegung Nurr.
 2010: Oliver Pietsch, Antje Majewski, Chris Newman & Miss Moth, Marion Pfeifer, Marc Aschenbrenner and Knut Klaßen, Christoph Draeger, Ant Farm, BitteBitteJaJa, Mathilde ter Heijne.
 2009: Ulf Aminde, Reynold Reynolds, gelitin and friends, Ulrich Polster, Eléonore de Montesquiou, Stefan Panhans, Knut Klassen, Marc Aschenbrenner
 2008: Annika Larsson & Samuel Nyholm, Sven Johne, Bjørn Melhus.

Literature 
 Olaf Stüber, Anton Stüber: "The Videoart at Midnight Artists' Cookbook", KERBER Publishing 2020,  
 Sven Hausherr, Nina Trippel: "CEE CEE BERLIN. Berlin Highlights", DISTANZ Verlag, Berlin 2014, 
 Ekaterina Rietz-Rakul, Steve Schepens: Berlin Contemporary Art. Editor: Alexander Grebennikov. Berlin 2011, .
 Julia Brodauf, Lena Hartmann, Ulrich J. C. Harz, Alexandra Wendorf, Stefanie Zobel: "OFF SPACES & SITES: Unusual Exhibition Spaces Beyond the Established Art Market", GKS-Fachverlag für den Kunstmarkt, Bad Honnef 2013,

References

External links 
 
 
 "Videoart at Midnight" on Kunstaspekte.de
 "Videoart at Midnight" on index.de
 "Videoart at Midnight" invited by Hirshhorn Museum, Washington, DC, USA

Arts festivals in Berlin
Video art
Film festivals established in 2008
2008 establishments in Germany